Møbelringen Cup 2017 was held in Norway, in the municipality Fjell which is west for the city Bergen. The tournament started on 23 November and finished on 26 November 2017.

Results

All times are Central European Time (UTC+1)

All-Star Team
The All-Star Team was announced on 26 November 2017.

Goalkeeper: 
Right wing: 
Right back: 
Centre back: 
Left back: 
Left wing: 
Pivot:

References

External links
Official Site

2017
2017 in handball
2017 in Norwegian sport
November 2017 sports events in Europe